This is a list of seasons played by Reading F.C. in the English Football League. The team, established in 1871, competes in the Championship, the second football league in England. Established in 1871, the club first entered the FA Cup in 1878–79 but did not play league football until the 1920–21 season.

The club has competed in all four tiers of the English Football League and has won the Championship twice, the Football League Second Division three times, the Football League Third Division once, reached the FA Cup semi-finals twice, reached the EFL Cup quarter-finals twice, won the London War Cup, won the Full Members Cup, won the Football League Third Division South Cup and won the Berks & Bucks Senior Cup three times.

Key 

 Pld = Matches played
 W = Matches won
 D = Matches drawn
 L = Matches lost
 GF = Goals for
 GA = Goals against
 Pts = Points
 Pos = Final position

 Premier League = Premier League
 Championship = EFL Championship
 Division 1 = Football League First Division
 Division 2 = Football League Second Division
 Division 3 = Football League Third Division
 Division 3 South = Football League Third Division South
 Division 4 = Football League Fourth Division
 Southern 1 = Southern Football League Division 1
 Southern 2 = Southern Football League Division 2
 Western Pro = Western Football League Professional Section
 Western 1 (A/B) = Western Football League Division One (Section A/B)
 United = United League

 Group = Group stage
 QR1/2/3 = First/Second/Third Qualifying Round etc.
 RInt = Intermediate Round
 R1/2/3 = First/Second/Third Round etc.
 QF = Quarter-finals
 SF = Semi-finals
 F = Final
 W = Winners

Seasons

Notes

References 

Seasons
 
Reading